The 2012–13 Argentine Primera B Metropolitana was the season of third division professional of football in Argentina. A total of 21 teams competed; the champion was promoted to Argentine Primera B Nacional.

Club information

Table

Standings

Torneo Reducido
The semifinals and finals is determined by the team standings in the regular season.

Semifinals

|-

|-

|-
|}

Finals

|-

|-
|}

Relegation

See also
2012–13 in Argentine football

References

External links
List of Argentine second division champions by RSSSF

3
Primera B Metropolitana seasons